The HPE Storage (formerly HP StorageWorks) is a portfolio of HPE storage products, includes online storage, nearline storage, storage networking, archiving, de-duplication, and storage software. HP and their predecessor, the Compaq Corporation, has developed some of industry-first storage technologies to simplify network storage. HP is a proponent of converged storage, a storage architecture that combines storage and compute into a single entity.

2011 products and solutions
HP Storage solutions announced in August 2011:
 HPE 3PAR 
Utility Storage - shifts workloads, boost utilization by logically pooling capacity
P10000, Peer Motion Software - refreshes/maintains storage, seeking zero application downtime
 and expanded its Converged Storage portfolio with the first federated storage capability to span from entry to high end systems and is available for both HP LeftHand and HP 3PAR storage systems. With HP Peer Motion, IT organizations can eliminate boundaries between systems with storage federation. For information on HP 3PAR Utility Storage, go to https://www.hpe.com/us/en/storage/3par.html

Other StorageWorks items:
 HP X9000 IBRIX Storage System - Simplify the storage and archival of massive content pools.
 HP P6000 Enterprise Virtual Array (EVA) - 5th generation EVA to squeeze the most out of infrastructure
 HP X5000 G2 Network Storage System - Consolidate servers and increase data availability.

Disk arrays

 HPE 3PAR StoreServ Storage Array (8000, 9000, 20000)
 HPE XP7 Disk Array
 HPE Nimble Storage (All-Flash Arrays, Adaptive Flash Arrays, HPE Cloud Volumes)
 HPE MSA Storage (SAN Storage Solution)
 HPE StoreEasy Storage (File storage appliances based on Microsoft Windows Storage Server)
 HPE StoreOnce (Data Protection Backup Appliances)

Tape libraries
 HP Storage ESL G3 Tape Libraries
 HP Storage MSL Tape Libraries
 HP StorageWorks 1/8 G2 Tape Autoloader
 HP Storage 12000 Virtual Library System EVA Gateway
 HP Storage 9000 Virtual Library System
 HP StoreOnce D2D Backup System (various models)
 HP StoreOnce B6000 Backup System

Storage networking
Many models have been rebadged from Brocade Communications Systems, Cisco, Emulex, and QLogic.

Storage software
 HP StoreOnce Deduplication
 HP Storage Essentials
 HP StorageWorks Storage Mirroring

PolyServe
PolyServe was founded in 2004 by Michael Callahan, serving as chief technology officer, and Carter George, serving as Vice-President, as "a software company in Portland, specializing in database and file serving."

HP, when it bought Compaq, acquired its StorageWorks; HP, when it bought PolyServe, placed its 100+ employees within StorageWorks.

An example of PolyServe's value is that a large British government agency which had 14 idle backup servers 
 dropped the number to two, even though "PolyServe doesn't require the passive nodes, but he maintains them as extra protection" and
 reduced "failover time from five minutes to 30 seconds .. by 90% the number of users who lose connections during a failover."

See also
HP XP
HPE 3PAR
OpenView Storage Area Manager

References

External links
HPE Data Storage

Server appliance
HP storage servers